Union Prairie Township is one of eighteen townships in Allamakee County, Iowa, USA.  At the 2010 census, its population was 761.

History
Union Prairie Township was organized in 1852.

Geography
According to the USGS, it contains three cemeteries: Eells Plot, Mount Olivet and West Ridge.

References

External links
 US-Counties.com
 City-Data.com

Townships in Allamakee County, Iowa
Townships in Iowa
1852 establishments in Iowa
Populated places established in 1852